Eunidia fallaciosa is a species of beetle in the family Cerambycidae. It was described by Stephan von Breuning in 1939. It is known from Somalia.

Subspecies
 Eunidia fallaciosa elongata Téocchi & Sudre, 2002
 Eunidia fallaciosa fallaciosa Breuning, 1939

References

Endemic fauna of Somalia
Eunidiini
Beetles described in 1939